Ng Tung Chai is a village in Lam Tsuen, Tai Po District, Hong Kong. The village is also known as Wong Fung Chai.

Recognised status
Ng Tung Chai is a recognised village under the New Territories Small House Policy.

History
Ng Tung Chai is a Hakka village. It was established in 1739, or possibly earlier.

Conservation
The Ng Tung Chai revine on the north-west of Tai Mo Shan, covering an area of 226 hectares, is floristically one of the richest places in Hong Kong. The area was designated as a Site of Special Scientific Interest in 1979.

References

External links

 Delineation of area of existing village Ng Tung Chai (Tai Po) for election of resident representative (2019 to 2022)
 Antiquities Advisory Board. Historic Building Appraisal. Yau Ancestral Hall, Ng Tung Chai Pictures
 Antiquities Advisory Board. Historic Building Appraisal. Shum Study Hall, No. 28 Ng Tung Chai Pictures
 Webpage about Ng Tung Chai and Lam Tsuen

Villages in Tai Po District, Hong Kong
Lam Tsuen